The 1981–82 Superliga Espanola de Hockey Hielo season was the 10th season of the Superliga Espanola de Hockey Hielo, the top level of ice hockey in Spain. Six teams participated in the league, and CH Vizcaya Bilbao won the championship.

Standings

External links
Season on hockeyarchives.info

Spain
Liga Nacional de Hockey Hielo seasons
Liga